The 1984 United States Senate election in Kentucky was held on November 5, 1984. Incumbent Democratic U.S. Senator Walter Dee Huddleston ran for reelection to a third term, but was defeated by Republican Mitch McConnell by less than 0.5%. In spite of President Ronald Reagan's landslide reelection victory, this was the only Senate seat picked up by Republicans in 1984.

Democratic primary

Candidates
 Walter Dee Huddleston, incumbent U.S. Senator

Results
Huddleston was unopposed in the Democratic Party's primary. Governor John Y. Brown Jr. filed to run in March 1984, but withdrew for health reasons a few weeks later.

Republican primary

Candidates
 Mitch McConnell, Jefferson County Executive
 Roger Harker
 Tommy Klein, perennial candidate
 Thurman Jerome Hamlin, perennial candidate

Results

General election

Candidates
 Walter Dee Huddleston (D), incumbent U.S. Senator
 Mitch McConnell (R), Jefferson County Executive
 Dave Welters (SW)

Results

See also 
 1984 United States Senate elections

References

1984 Kentucky elections
Kentucky
1984